Enid Jones-Boston (born 1995) is a Sierra Leonean model and beauty pageant titleholder who was crowned as the winner of the 2019 edition of the Miss Sierra Leone pageant.

Early life and education
Born into a middle-class Creole family in Freetown, Sierra Leone; Jones-Boston attended Annie Walsh Memorial School and is an alumna of the Institute of Public Administration and Management, University of Sierra Leone.

Pageantry

Miss University Africa 2017
Jones-Boston contested at the 5th edition of the Miss University Africa held on 2 December 2017 at Obi Wali International Conference Center in Port Harcourt.

Miss Sierra Leone 2019
Whilst representing Western Area Rural District, Jones-Boston was crowned winner of the 2019 edition of Miss Sierra Leone that was held on 22 September 2019 at the Bintumani Conference Centre in Freetown. This result qualified her to represent her country at the Miss World 2019 pageant held on 14 December at the ExCeL London, UK.

Miss World 2019
She represented Sierra Leone at the Miss World 2019 pageant but failed to place.

References

External links
Enid Jones-Boston on Miss Sierra Leone 2019
 Miss World Official Profile

Sierra Leone Creole people
People of Sierra Leone Creole descent
1995 births
Living people
Miss World 2019 delegates
Sierra Leonean beauty pageant winners
People from Freetown